The 2008 Football Northern Territory season in Northern Territory. The men's competitions consisted of two major divisions across the State.

League table

2008 North Zone Premier League
The season began on 26 April, concluding with the Grand Final on 13 September.

Finals series

2008 South Zone A Grade
The season began on 27 April, concluding on 31 August.

Finals series

References

2008 in Australian soccer
Soccer in the Northern Territory